Bhadriraju Krishnamurti (19 June 1928 – 11 August 2012) was an Indian linguist, specialized in Dravidian languages. He was born in Ongole (Andhra Pradesh). He was Vice Chancellor of Hyderabad Central University from 1986 to 1993 and founded the Department of Linguistics at Osmania University where he served as professor from 1962 to 1986. His magnum opus The Dravidian Languages is considered a landmark volume in the study of Dravidian linguistics.

Krishnamurti was a student and close associate of Murray Barnson Emeneau. He got his A.M. and PhD degrees from the University of Pennsylvania in 1955 and 1957 respectively. His grandson Ravi Bhadriraju was a rhythm guitarist in the death metal band Job for a Cowboy.

Contribution to linguistics
Krishnamurti is considered to be among the first to apply the rigour of modern comparative linguistic theory to further the study of Dravidian languages. His thesis Telugu Verbal Bases (1961) is the first comprehensive account of comparative Dravidian phonology and derivational morphology of verbal bases in Dravidian from the standpoint of Telugu. His research was devoted to the central problems of phonology and morphology/syntax of Dravidian, and he made significant contributions in advancing the then nascent field of comparative and historical Dravidian studies in the second half of the twentieth century. His Comparative Dravidian Linguistics: Current Perspectives is a collection of twenty-one important articles published during the period 1955–1998, which attempts to provide solutions to many outstanding problems of Dravidian linguistics. His recent work The Dravidian Languages published by Cambridge University Press (2003) is a culmination of the scholarly research carried out by him in the last fifty years. It replaces Caldwell's one-hundred-fifty-year-old A comparative Grammar of Dravidian or South Indian Family of Languages as a comprehensive and authoritative source of reference on the Dravidian languages.

After a brief service (1960–61) at the University of California, Berkeley, he returned to India and started the Department of Linguistics at Osmania University which later became the first center of Advanced Studies in Linguistics in India. He was also instrumental in conceptualizing, designing and implementing the compilation of A Telugu Dialect Dictionary of Occupational Vocabularies in Andhra Pradesh, India, and so far over a dozen volumes covering different occupations and dialects have been published. This series is first of its kind in India.

Positions held
Krishnamurti worked as a lecturer in Telugu at Andhra University (1949–61); Assistant Professor at the University of California, Berkeley (1960–61); Reader in Telugu, S. V. U.(1961–62); Professor of Linguistics (1962–88), Osmania University, Dean, Faculty of Arts (1973–76), Member, Univ Syndicate (1971–75); Director, Southern Regional Centre, Indian Council of Social Science Research (1978–82); Vice-Chancellor, University of Hyderabad (1986–93), Honorary Professor, University of Hyderabad 1993–99; Andhra University 2003–.

Krishnamurti was also associated with the study of South Indian languages in many western institutions, and was a visiting professor of linguistics at several universities. He was the first Asian Fellow at ANU (1974), a Resident Fellow at the Center for Advanced Study in the Behavioral Sciences, Stanford (1975–76), and Rama Watumaull Distinguished Indian Scholar at the University of Hawaii (1995).

He was a visiting professor at University of Michigan, Ann Arbor (1967), Cornell University, Ithaca (1967,
1970), Australian National University (1974), Tokyo University (1982), University of Pennsylvania, Philadelphia (1983), University
of Illinois, Urbana-Champaign (1986), University of Hawaii (1995), University of Texas at Arlington (1995).
Resident Fellow, Center for Advanced Study in the Behavioral Sciences, Stanford (2000
–2001), Member, Institute for Advanced Study, Princeton (1999–2000), Visiting Fellow,
Research Centre for Linguistic Typology, Institute for Advanced Study, La Trobe University, Melbourne
(2001), Visiting Scientist, Max Planck Institute in Evolutionary Anthropology, Leipzig, Germany
(2003 September–November); He was also served as President of the Linguistic Society of India in 1970, and also as President of the Dravidian Linguistics Association in 1980.

Awards
He was the first of the two Indian scholars to become a fellow of the Royal Society of Edinburgh (2004), and only second Indian after S. K. Chatterji to receive an honorary membership from the Linguistic Society of America in 1985. He was elected Corresponding Fellow of the Royal Society of Edinburgh, UK, in 2004. He had been an executive member of Sahitya Akademi, New Delhi, 1990–2002. He was conferred an honorary doctorate in literature by Sri Venkateswara University in 1998, and by Dravidian University in 2007. He was elected Fellow of Sahitya Akademi, New Delhi, in 2004. He received the Gidugu Ramamurti Award at the 15th TANA (Telugu Association of North America), Detroit, July 2005. He was the first recipient of the Telugu Bhaarati Award instituted by C.P.Brown Academy, Hyderabad (2008). He also received the Lifetime Achievement Award at the 10th ATA (American Telugu Association), New Jersey, for significant contributions to Telugu and Dravidian linguistics, 3–5 July 2008. He was presented Indian Linguistics, Vol. 70, as Festschrift by the Linguistic Society of India, on the occasion of his 80th birth year in 2009.

He died after a brief illness in 2012.

Publications in English

Authored

Edited

Publications in Telugu

Authored

Edited

References

External links
 Bhadriraju Krishnamurti at academia.edu

Dravidologists
1928 births
2012 deaths
Telugu people
20th-century Indian linguists
Academic staff of Osmania University
English-language writers from India
Indian editors
Academic staff of Andhra University
Scholars from Andhra Pradesh
Heads of universities and colleges in India